George Frederick Macnamara (June 1893 – 18 August 1916) was an Irish first-class cricketer.

Macnamara was born at Dublin in June 1893 to Richard and Mary Macnamara, with Richard being a prominent solicitor. He was one of six children. He was sent to England for his education, where he attended The Oratory School, one of England's leading Catholic schools. From there, he went up to New College, Oxford. He played cricket for his college, but was not selected to represent Oxford University Cricket Club. He did however play football for Oxford University, which earned him a half blue. During the summer break, Macnamara would return to Ireland, where he played club cricket for Leinster. He made one appearance in first-class cricket for Ireland against Scotland at Edinburgh in 1913. Batting twice in the match, Macnamara scored 30 runs in Ireland's first-innings, before being dismissed by Lovat Fraser, while in their second-innings he ended unbeaten on 24. He also bowled 13 wicket-less overs across both Scotland innings. He graduated from New College in 1914, with a fourth-class degree in history. 

Macnamara served in the British Army during World War I, enlisting with the Royal Dublin Fusiliers as a Second Lieutenant (on probation) in August 1915. He had some previous military experience when he was a member of the Officers' Training Corps at Oxford University. He was confirmed in the rank of Second Lieutenant in April 1916. He was killed in action during the Battle of the Somme on 18 August 1916, while defending a salient near Loos-en-Gohelle. He is buried at the Philisophe British Cemetery at Mazingarbe.

References

1893 births
1916 deaths
Cricketers from Dublin (city)
People educated at The Oratory School
Alumni of New College, Oxford
Oxford University A.F.C. players
Association footballers not categorized by position
Irish association footballers (before 1923)
Irish cricketers
British Army personnel of World War I
Royal Dublin Fusiliers officers
British military personnel killed in the Battle of the Somme
Military personnel from Dublin (city)